Stanley 'Spike' Glasser (28 February 1926 – 5 August 2018), was a South African-born British composer and academic who studied with Benjamin Frankel and Mátyás Seiber. His concert music was deeply influenced by his ethnomusicological investigations of native African music. The elder son of first-generation Jewish immigrants from Lithuania, he was forced to flee South Africa's apartheid regime in 1963 due to his relationship with black jazz singer Maud Damons.

Glasser was an Emeritus Professor at Goldsmiths, University of London, an institution to which he devoted many years, becoming Head of the Music Department in 1969 and rising to the position of Dean of Humanities in the 1980s.

Glasser's visionary interest in all areas of contemporary musical development led to his department being a pioneer in the exploration of electronic music, and the music studio purchased one of the first Fairlight CMI sampling systems to find its way to Britain. 
 The electronic music studio is named in honour of Professor Glasser.

Glasser is arguably South Africa's first composer of electronic music thanks to a 1960 performance of the Eugene O'Neill play The Emperor Jones in Johannesburg for which he wrote incidental electronic music.

The most popular of his compositions have been recorded by the Kings Singers. His ethnomusicological field research is now held at the British Library.

Selected works 

 The Emperor Jones, electronic music - 1959.
 The Chameleon and the Lizard, for orchestra and choir - 1970 (words by Lewis Nkosi).
 Lalela Zulu (Listen to Things Zulu), for vocal ensemble - 1977 (words by Lewis Nkosi).
 The Ward, song cycle for mezzo soprano & double reed octet - 1984 (words by Brian Trowell).

Selected recordings 
 Lalela Zulu - Kings Singers Street Songs (RCA Victor Red Seal, 1998).

References

External links
 Article by Hugh Davies about the Stanley Glasser Electronic Music Studios at Goldsmiths, University of London, from Contact issue #15 (Winter 1976/77).
 Stanley Glasser Electronic Music Studios at Goldsmiths, University of London.
 Tribute from the London Bach Society. 
 Obituary by Stephanus Muller.
 Obituary by Keith Potter; The Guardian, 19 October 2018. 
 Obituary by Kenneth Shenton; The Independent, 5 November 2018.
  Stanley Glasser: South African music recordings.

1926 births
2018 deaths
South African composers
South African male composers
Academic staff of the University of Cape Town
Academics of Goldsmiths, University of London